The 49th parallel south is a circle of latitude that is 49 degrees south of the Earth's equatorial plane. It crosses the Atlantic Ocean, the Indian Ocean, the Pacific Ocean and South America.

At this latitude the sun is visible for 16 hours, 12 minutes during the December solstice and 8 hours, 14 minutes during the June solstice.

Around the world
Starting at the Prime Meridian and heading eastwards, the parallel 49° south passes through:

{| class="wikitable plainrowheaders"
! scope="col" width="125" | Co-ordinates
! scope="col" | Country, territory or ocean
! scope="col" | Notes
|-
| style="background:#b0e0e6;" | 
! scope="row" style="background:#b0e0e6;" | Atlantic Ocean
| style="background:#b0e0e6;" |
|-
| style="background:#b0e0e6;" | 
! scope="row" style="background:#b0e0e6;" | Indian Ocean
| style="background:#b0e0e6;" |
|-valign="top"
| 
! scope="row" | 
| Kerguelen Islands
|-
| style="background:#b0e0e6;" | 
! scope="row" style="background:#b0e0e6;" | Indian Ocean
| style="background:#b0e0e6;" |
|-
| style="background:#b0e0e6;" | 
! scope="row" style="background:#b0e0e6;" | Pacific Ocean
| style="background:#b0e0e6;" | Passing north of the Antipodes Islands, 
|-valign="top"
| 
! scope="row" | 
| Wellington Island, the English Narrows and mainland, Magallanes Region
|-
| 
! scope="row" | 
| Santa Cruz Province
|-
| style="background:#b0e0e6;" | 
! scope="row" style="background:#b0e0e6;" | Atlantic Ocean
| style="background:#b0e0e6;" |
|}

See also
48th parallel south
50th parallel south

s49